was a Japanese court noble of the late Edo period. He held the regent position of kampaku from 1823–1856.

Biography 
Masamichi was born the son of regent Takatsukasa Masahiro.

He served as kampaku from 1823–1856. In 1856, at the Ansei Purge, he was prosecuted and later became a priest.

He had a son, Sukehiro, with the daughter of the seventh head of Mito Domain Tokugawa Harutoshi. One of his daughters married the 13th head of Tokushima Domain Hachisuka Narihiro.

References
 
 Japanese Wikipedia

1789 births
1868 deaths
Fujiwara clan
Takatsukasa family